Ruslan Ajba is the current Minister for Labour, Employment and Social Security of Abkhazia.

Early life and education
Ajba was born in 1975 in the village of Achandara, Gudauta District. He finished school in 1992 and graduated in 1999 in finance and credit from the economic faculty of the Abkhazian State University. In subsequent years Ajba worked as Chief Specialist in the Main Control Directorate of the presidential administration.

Pension Fund Head and Minister for Labour
On 11 November 2011, Ajba was appointed Head of the Pension Fund by President Alexander Ankvab.

On 23 August 2016, Ajba was appointed Minister for Labour, Employment and Social Security in the new cabinet of Prime Minister Beslan Bartsits, succeeding Suren Kerselyan.

References

1975 births
Living people
Ministers for Labour and Social Security of Abkhazia
People from Gudauta District